100 Meters is a 2016 Spanish film directed by Marcel Barrena. The plot is based on the true story of a Spanish man with multiple sclerosis who tried to finish an Ironman triathlon –3,8 km swimming, 180 km cycling and 42 km running– after he received his diagnosis he was told that he would not be able to walk 100 meters within a year.

Cast

See also 
 List of Spanish films of 2016

References

External links 

2016 films
2010s sports comedy-drama films
2010s biographical films
2010s Spanish films
2010s Spanish-language films
Spanish biographical films
Sports films based on actual events
Medical-themed films
Athletics films
Films about multiple sclerosis
Spanish sports comedy-drama films